The 1992 Gael Linn Cup, the most important representative competition for elite level participants in the women's team field sport of camogie, was won by Munster, who defeated Leinster in the final, played at O'Toole Park.

Arrangements
Munster defeated Ulster 2–12 to 2–7 at Holycross. Leinster defeated Connacht 6–14 to 1–3 at Turloughmore. Munster, with 19-year-old Deirdre Hughes the only non-Cork player on the team, then defeated Leinster in the final by 1–18 to 2–9.
In the Gael Linn trophy semi-final Deirdre Hughes as Munster defeated Ulster 5–6 to 2–7. Connacht defeated Leinster, 2–5 to 1–6. Munster then defeated Connacht 6–11 to 3–3 in the final.

Final stages

|}

Junior Final

|}

References

External links
 Camogie Association

1992 in camogie
1992